Aaron McWilliams (born November 2, 1983) is an American politician who served as a member of the North Dakota House of Representatives for the 20th district from 2016 to 2018.

References

1983 births
Living people
Republican Party members of the North Dakota House of Representatives
21st-century American politicians